V. maculata may refer to:

 Vamuna maculata, an Asian moth
 Vanmanenia maculata, an Asian loach
 Venus maculata, a saltwater clam
 Vespa maculata, a North American wasp